This is a list of active herbaria, organized first by continent where the herbarium is located, then within each continent by size of the collection. The list is based on the Index Herbariorum, a global directory of herbaria and their associated staff.

A herbarium (plural "herbaria") is a collection of preserved plant specimens. These specimens may be whole plants or plant parts: these will usually be in a dried form, mounted on a sheet, but depending upon the material may also be kept in alcohol or other preservative. The same term is often used in mycology to describe an equivalent collection of preserved fungi and in phycology to describe a collection of algae. To preserve their form and color, plants collected in the field are spread flat on sheets of newsprint and dried, usually in a plant press, between blotters or absorbent paper. The specimens, which are then mounted on sheets of stiff white paper, are labeled with all essential data, such as collector, date and place found, description of the plant, elevation, and special habitat conditions. The sheet is then placed in a protective case. As a precaution against insect damage, the pressed plant is frozen or poisoned and the case disinfected. Most herbaria use a standard system of organizing their specimens into herbarium cases. Specimen sheets are stacked in groups by the species to which they belong and placed into a large lightweight folder that is labelled on the bottom edge. Groups of species folders are then placed together into larger, heavier folders by genus. The genus folders are then sorted by taxonomic family according to the standard system selected for use by the herbarium and placed into pigeonholes in herbarium cabinets.

Herbaria are essential for the study of plant taxonomy, the study of geographic distributions, and the stabilizing of nomenclature. Herbaria also preserve an historical record of change in vegetation over time. In some cases, plants become extinct in one area, or may become extinct altogether. In such cases, specimens preserved in an herbarium can represent the only record of the plant's original distribution. Environmental scientists make use of such data to track changes in climate and human impact.

Africa

Asia

Australasia and Oceania

Europe

North America
Includes herbaria in Central America and the West Indies.

South America

See also 
 List of botanical gardens

References 

Biology-related lists
Nature-related lists
Herbaria